The Azim Choudhury Zamindar Bari is a historic estate and Bengali family based in the village of Dulai in Sujanagar, Pabna District.

History

Sharfuddin Sarkar and Rahimuddin Chowdhury
The zamindar palace was established 250 years ago in the village of Dulai, Sujanagar, Pabna by a Muslim aristocrat known as Munshi Rahimuddin Sarkar (1722-1815). His father, Sharfuddin Sarkar, settled in Dulai (Ahladipur village), after migrating from Samarkand in Turkestan. Rahimuddin was the serestadar and peshkar (deputy minister) at the Rajshahi Collectorate Office in Natore, and was a munshi proficient in Arabic and Persian. He was later bestowed the title of Chowdhury. In 1802, he built a mosque in the estate which still exists today.

Azim Chowdhury
The zamindari gained repute under his son and successor, Fakhruddin Ahle Ahsan Azim Chowdhury (1790-1880), also known as Moulvi Azimuddin Chowdhury or simply Azim Chowdhury. He established three indigo factories in Dulai and was well-known for his charity work too. The Dulai dispensary, according to William Wilson Hunter in A Statistical Account of Bengal, was "entirely supported" by Azim Chowdhury. It was established in October 1867 and was one of the three dispensaries in Pabna District at the time.

Present day 
At present, this zamindar house is in ruins, although it is currently being maintained by the descendants of this zamindar house. In fact, after the abolition of the zamindari system through the East Bengal State Acquisition and Tenancy Act of 1950, it became subordinate to the government. Later, the descendants of this zamindar house, like Faruq Husayn Chowdhury and Ahsan Jan Chowdhury, got this estate back in 1994 through a long legal process. Since then they have been in charge of the maintenance of this palace.

See also 
Naimuddin
Zamindars of Mahipur

References 

Muslim families
Bengali families
Zamindari estates
Bangladeshi families
Bangladeshi people of Turkic descent
People from Sujanagar Upazila
Sujanagar Upazila